This is a list of programs on the TV network LaSexta.

References 

Lists of television series by network
Television stations in Spain
 
Sexta